On May 9, 2021, a mass shooting occurred at a birthday party in Colorado Springs, Colorado, United States. Seven people were killed, including the gunman who committed suicide.

Shooting 
Shortly after midnight on May 9, 2021, police responded to a shooting at Canterbury Mobile Home Park, located near the Colorado Springs Airport. The shooting happened at a birthday party, with adults and children gathered inside. According to the police, the perpetrator was a boyfriend of one of the female victims; he drove to the home, walked in, and started shooting. He then killed himself. The birthday party was for one of the people killed in the shooting.

When the police arrived, they found six adults who were dead, including the perpetrator, and one man with serious injuries. He was transported to a hospital and died there. The children present in the home at the time of the shooting were not injured.

Perpetrator 
The police subsequently identified the shooter as Teodoro Macias, age 28. Macias was the boyfriend of one of the victims, whose family was hosting the birthday party. The family had a conflict with Macias about a week earlier because of his jealous and controlling behavior, and he had not been invited to the party. Macias had no criminal record.

Macias was armed with a Smith & Wesson 9mm semi-automatic pistol and two 15-round magazines, one of which was still loaded. The gun was purchased at a local gun store in 2014, but Macias was not the buyer. The gun had not been reported stolen, and the police were trying to determine where and how Macias obtained it.

See also 
List of mass shootings in the United States in 2021
List of shootings in Colorado

References 

2021 in Colorado
2021 mass shootings in the United States
2021 murders in the United States
2020s crimes in Colorado
Attacks on buildings and structures in 2021
Attacks on buildings and structures in the United States
2021 shooting
Deaths by firearm in Colorado
May 2021 crimes in the United States
21st-century mass murder in the United States
Mass shootings in Colorado
Mass shootings in the United States
Mass murder in 2021
Murder–suicides in Colorado